Honeyri-ye Seh (also Romanized as Honeyrī-ye Seh) is a village in Mollasani Rural District, in the Central District of Bavi County, Khuzestan Province, Iran. At the 2006 census, its population was 41, in 7 families.

References 

Populated places in Bavi County